Willy Zeyn (12 March 1907 – 17 February 1983) was a German film editor and producer. He was the son of the silent film director Willy Zeyn.

Selected filmography

Editor
 Darling of the Gods (1930)
 Her Grace Commands (1931)
 Princess, At Your Orders! (1931)
 Caught in the Act (1931)
 Bombs on Monte Carlo (1931)
 A Blonde Dream (1932)
 Waltz War (1933)
 Court Waltzes (1933)
 The Island (1934)
 Decoy (1934)
 The Girlfriend of a Big Man (1934)
 The Decoy (1935)
 The Old and the Young King (1935)
 The Tiger of Eschnapur (1938)
 The Indian Tomb (1938)
 The Barber of Seville (1938)
 The Song of Aixa (1939)
 The Fox of Glenarvon (1940)
 Everything for Gloria (1941)
 My Life for Ireland (1941)

Producer
 Trouble Backstairs (1949)
 Hanna Amon (1951)
 The Chaplain of San Lorenzo (1953)
 I and You (1953)
 Street Serenade (1953)
 A Woman of Today (1954)
 Guitars of Love (1954)
 Santa Lucia (1956)
 The Blue Sea and You (1959)
 A Thousand Stars Aglitter (1959)
 Brandenburg Division (1960)
 I Learned That in Paris (1960)
 The Legion's Last Patrol (1962)

References

Bibliography
 Gerd Gemünden. A Foreign Affair: Billy Wilder's American Films. Berghahn Books, 2008.

External links

1907 births
1983 deaths
Film people from Schleswig-Holstein
Mass media people from Kiel